Florin Macovei (born 12 January 1987) is a Romanian former footballer who played in Liga I for Ceahlăul Piatra Neamț.

References

External links
 

1987 births
Living people
Romanian footballers
Association football midfielders
Liga I players
CSM Ceahlăul Piatra Neamț players
Sportspeople from Piatra Neamț